Viktoriia Andreevna Vorobeva (born 23 April 1994) is a Russian badminton player. In the national event, she plays for Kazan, Republic of Tatarstan. She educated at the student of Volga State Academy of Physical Culture, Sports and Tourism.

Achievements

BWF International Challenge/Series (6 titles, 8 runners-up) 
Women's doubles

Mixed doubles

  BWF International Challenge tournament
  BWF International Series tournament
  BWF Future Series tournament

References

External links 
 

1994 births
Living people
Sportspeople from Kazan
Russian female badminton players
21st-century Russian women